Basis set may refer to:
 Basis (linear algebra)
 Basis set (chemistry)